Bachfeld is a village and a former municipality in the Sonneberg district of Thuringia, Germany. Since December 2019, it is part of the town Schalkau.

References

Sonneberg (district)
Duchy of Saxe-Meiningen
Former municipalities in Thuringia